Attwood Shute was mayor of Philadelphia, serving from October 5, 1756 to October 5, 1758. He was an Episcopalian.

References

Mayors of Philadelphia